Iteaceae is a flowering plant family of trees and shrubs native to the eastern USA, southeastern Africa, and south and Southeastern Asia.  Some older taxonomic systems place the genus Itea in the family Grossulariaceae. The APG III system of 2009 includes the former Pterostemonaceae in Iteaceae. Consequently, it now has two genera with a total of 18 known species.

Fossil record 
The family is known from fossil flowers dating to the Turonian age of the Late Cretaceous that have been found in the Raritan Formation, New Jersey and from leaves dating to the Eocene found in the Klondike Mountain Formation, Washington.

Some seeds and one fruit of †Itea europea were found in two samples of muddy sediment from the Fossil Forest of Dunarobba. In northwestern Italy, it occurs with a some seeds and fruits in two sites of Early or Middle Pliocene age. These records suggest it was an accessory element of the mid-Pliocene swamp forest. Fossil pollen of Itea has been detected in a short section of the Sarzana Basin in north-western part of central Italy tentatively assigned to the Miocene-Pliocene transition. In this site a high pollen percentages of 12% suggest that Itea was an important element in the local vegetation. The nearest living relative of †Itea europaea is the American species Itea virginica.

References

External links 

Iteaceae in Stevens, P. F. (2001 onwards).

Saxifragales
Saxifragales families
Turonian first appearances
Extant Turonian first appearances